Theodore Nieman Kincannon (August 16, 1896 - January 29, 1936) was a pioneer of aviation, early airline pilot, and one of only ten recipients of the Airmail Flyers' Medal of Honor.

Early life
He was born on August 16, 1896 in Boonsville, Texas,  the only child of William Anderson Kincannon and Mary Bettie Barksdale.

College
Kincannon attended Polytechnic College in Fort Worth, now Texas Wesleyan University, in 1913 – 1914. When the campus was re-designated as a woman's college Kincannon transferred to Southern Methodist University for studies 1915 – 1916.  While attending SMU, Kincannon played baseball and managed the basketball team.

The Army and learning to fly
Kincannon joined the Army and learned to fly in 1918.  After his time in the Army he spent some time in Kentucky working for an Air Service company.  In 1932 Kincannon went to work for American Airlines in the Dallas, Fort Worth area flying routes to St. Louis, El Paso, Amarillo, and Atlanta.  He spent a short time in New Orleans as station manager.  By September 1934 Kincannon was flying a new route from Dallas-Fort Worth to Chicago.

Flight incident
A veteran of more than 8,100 hours in the air, Kincannon made his finally flight on January 29, 1936. On the last leg of his Chicago, Dallas-Fort Worth via Oklahoma City, Oklahoma route Kincannon ran into a blinding snow storm. Only minutes from the destination, Love Field, the carburetor heater failed causing ice to build up and the aircraft began to lose power. Kincannon instructed the passengers to strap themselves in and began searching for an area to make a forced landing. He spotted a field, belonging to Mr. and Mrs. Eugene Grace, near Little Elm, Denton County and began circling while planning his descent.  Kincannon cut the motor, to avoid a fire starting, and committed to his approach.  Mr. Grace heard the plane passing over head and then the crash but was unable to see anything due to the blinding snow.  Kincannon managed to get the plane down just 200 yards south of the farm home and a mere nine miles from Love Field. Within a few minutes the five passengers managed to walk to the Grace home and call for help. Due to the weather and rural farm roads it took some time to get to the crash site.  Kincannon was still strapped in his seat but had suffered a head wound from a piece of flying debris.  His watch has stopped at 3:06, the time of the crash.  He died in the ambulance on the way to Frisco. The five passengers, to include an American Airline Engineer, credited the pilot's skill with saving their lives.

The passengers were:
M. P. Youker, Dallas.
John Schultz, New York.
T. P. Malloy, Shreveport, La.
George Rice, San Antonio.
William Littlewood, chief engineer, American Airlines, Chicago.

Medal Citation

President Roosevelt presents award
On April 12, 1937 President Franklin Delano Roosevelt posthumously presented Sue Kincannon, Ted's widow, with the Airmail Flyers' Medal of Honor for his actions on January 29, 1936 when he landed his plane saving the lives of his passengers and the mail.

References

External links
 H.R.101
 Public law 661
 Public law 91-375 (12 Aug. 1970)
 Appropriations A-35875 April 2, 1931, 10 Comp.Gen.543 
 JOMSA article 1990 Vol. 141.3.13
 JOMSA article 1953 May - Aug
 JOMSA article 1966 Vol. 17.12.7
 NASM Medal image (Silver) 
 NASM Medal image (Bronze) 
 

Aviators from Texas
1896 births
1936 deaths
General Mills people
Medals
United States airmail pilots
Commercial aviators
Victims of aviation accidents or incidents in 1936